The Communist Party of Bangladesh (Marxist–Leninist) is a political party in Bangladesh. The party's general secretary is Dilip Barua. The BSD-ML is part of the Left Democratic Front and the 11-Party Alliance. The verified electoral symbol of the BSD-ML party is a chair.

References 

Communist parties in Bangladesh
Political parties in Bangladesh
Political parties with year of establishment missing